Andy Larkins (born 30 October 1928) is a former Australian rules footballer who played for the Geelong Football Club in the Victorian Football League (VFL).

Notes

External links 

Living people
1928 births
Australian rules footballers from Victoria (Australia)
Geelong Football Club players
Colac Football Club players